Landing Zone Two Bits (also known as FSB Two Bits) was a U.S. Army and Army of the Republic of Vietnam (ARVN) base located in the Bồng Sơn region northeast of An Khe, Bình Định Province in central Vietnam.

The base was located near the intersection of Highway 1 and Highway 514, approximately 50 km northeast of An Khe.

Establishment

Two Bits was established in July 1967 as the forward command post of the 1st Cavalry Division and together with Landing Zone English, remained in use by the division until they moved into I Corps in January 1968.

The 3rd Brigade, 4th Infantry Division, comprising:
1st Battalion, 14th Infantry
1st Battalion, 35th Infantry
2nd Battalion, 35th Infantry
1st Battalion, 50th Infantry
was based here from March-April 1968.

Other units based here included:
7th Battalion, 13th Artillery (1967-October 1969)
1st Battalion, 30th Artillery (April 1967-February 1968)
5th Maintenance Battalion
534th Signal Company

References

Installations of the United States Army in South Vietnam
Installations of the Army of the Republic of Vietnam
Military installations closed in 1969
Buildings and structures in Bình Định province